Lawrence Mendelsohn is a former Israel international lawn bowler.

He won a gold medal in the triples during the 1992 World Outdoor Bowls Championship in Worthing.

References

Living people
Israeli male bowls players
Bowls World Champions
Year of birth missing (living people)